Ibrahim Janis Covi (born 21 March 2000) is a French footballer who plays for Spanish club SD Ponferradina B. Mainly a central defender, he can also play as a defensive midfielder.

Club career
In March 2017, Covi agreed to move from FCM Aubervilliers to FC Metz, with the deal being effective at the end of the season. In 2021, after finishing his formation, he moved to Spain and joined SD Ponferradina, being assigned to the reserves in Primera Regional.

In July 2022, after helping the B-side in their promotion to Tercera Federación, Covi renewed his contract with Ponfe for a further year. He made his first team debut on 12 November, starting in a 2–1 away loss against CD Guadalajara, for the season's Copa del Rey.

Covi made his professional debut on 19 November 2022, coming on as a half-time substitute for Adrián Diéguez in a 1–1 Segunda División home draw against Real Oviedo.

References

External links

2000 births
Living people
French footballers
Association football defenders
Segunda División players
Tercera Federación players
Divisiones Regionales de Fútbol players
SD Ponferradina B players
SD Ponferradina players
French expatriate footballers
French expatriate sportspeople in Spain
Expatriate footballers in Spain